Panos Panagiotopoulos (Greek: Πάνος Παναγιωτόπουλος; born 11 December 1957) is a Greek politician from the New Democracy who was Minister for Culture and Sport from June 2013 to June 2014, having previously been Minister for Defence from June 2012 to June 2013.

Panagiotopoulos was a Member of the European Parliament (MEP) from 1999 to 2009. He was the spokesman for the Hellenic Government (2007) as well as for New Democracy party (November 2009 – January 2011). In the past he has served as the Minister of Employment and Social Protection in Kostas Karamanlis's 2004 cabinet.

Biography
Panagiotopoulos was born in Athens in 1957. He originated from Arcadia and Evrytania. He served his military service in the Hellenic Air Force from 1978 to 1980. He studied civil engineering in National Technical University of Athens and law in National and Kapodistrian University of Athens as well as in University of Vincennes in Saint-Denis. He currently resides in Athens. He is fluent in English and French.He was married to Maouzi Tsaldari and he has a son.

References

External links

1957 births
Living people
20th-century Greek lawyers
National and Kapodistrian University of Athens alumni
Culture ministers of Greece
Greek MPs 2007–2009
Greek MPs 2009–2012
Greek MPs 2012 (May)
Greek MPs 2012–2014
Ministers of National Defence of Greece
Labour ministers of Greece
MEPs for Greece 1999–2004
MEPs for Greece 2004–2009
New Democracy (Greece) MEPs
Politicians from Athens
University of Paris alumni